Xiaoming Fu (born in Jiangxi, China) is a Chinese German computer scientist. He is a Full Professor of Computer Science with focus on Internet technologies at Universität Göttingen. His research interests include architecture, protocols and applications of networked systems including mobile and cloud computing, network security, social computing and big data.

Life 
Fu studied at Northeastern University (China), where he received his bachelor and master degrees. He received his PhD degree from Tsinghua University, Beijing, China in 2000. After working at Technische Universität Berlin as member of scientific staff, he joined Universität Göttingen where he was appointed as assistant professor (2002) and professor (2007) and head of computer networks group.

Awards 
 2009 Fulbright Scholar at UCLA Department of Computer Science
 2014-2015 appointed IEEE Communications Society Distinguished Lecturer
 2017 elected Fellow of the Institution of Engineering and Technology
 2018 elected member of Academia Europaea
 2021 elected Fellow of IEEE
 2021 elected ACM Distinguished Member

References 

Chinese expatriates in Germany
Chinese computer scientists
German computer scientists
Academic staff of the University of Göttingen
Year of birth missing (living people)
Living people